Associazione Calcio Reggiana 1919, commonly referred to as Reggiana, is a professional football club based in Reggio Emilia, Emilia-Romagna, Italy. The club was formed in 2018 upon an idea of 1919, and plays in the Serie C, the third tier of Italian football. Reggiana is known as i Granata ("the Maroons") in reference to the club's main colour: maroon.

The club was refounded two times after going bankrupt: in 2005 as Reggio Emilia Football Club, and in 2018 as Reggio Audace Football Club. In both occasions, the club subsequently regained the naming rights and the trophies of A.C. Reggiana via judicial auction. The club has participated in the Serie A, the top tier of Italian football, seven times; their last appearance dates back to the 1996–97 season.

History

A.C. Reggiana (1919–2005) 
The club was originally found in 1919 under the name A.C. Reggiana, and played in the Italian First Division for several seasons in the 1920s. More recently, it played in the Italian Serie A in 1993–94, 1994–95, and 1996–97. Their highest ranking was 13th place in the 1993–94 Serie A championship, where its main name was Brazilian goalkeeper Cláudio Taffarel, who would go on to win the 1994 FIFA World Cup after the season.

A.C. Reggiana 1919 (2005–2018) 
In July 2005, the sports title of A.C. Reggiana S.p.A. was transferred to a new investor, Reggio Emilia F.C. S.p.A., before being renamed as A.C. Reggiana 1919 S.p.A. soon after the start of the 2005–06 season.

In the 2007–08 Serie C2 regular season, the team finished first in Group B, and won direct promotion to Lega Pro Prima Divisione (formerly known as Serie C1 until that year) for the 2008–2009 season. Reggiana also won 2008 Supercoppa di Serie C2, a competition for three group stage winners of Serie C2.

The club was acquired by Italian-American former baseball player Mike Piazza in 2016. After the 2017–18 season, the Piazza family decided not to register the team in the 2018–19 Serie C season, leading the club to the loss of its sporting title and subsequent exclusion from the Italian professional leagues.

Reggio Audace F.C. (2018–2020) 
On 31 July 2018, a new entity was formed in Reggio Emilia, called Reggio Audace F.C.. The name was given in honour of a precursor entity of the 1910s, where Reggiana founder Severino Taddei used to play before founding the granata club. The new club, whose ownership was the expression of local entrepreneurs from Reggio Emilia, subsequently announced former Ravenna manager Mauro Antonioli as the new gaffer of the newborn club, admitted into the 2018–19 Serie D. Two days later a three-year partnership was signed with Macron. On 20 August 2018 striker Nicola Luche became the first ever signing of the club.

The club gained promotion to the Serie B, after having been admitted by repechage to the Serie C due to vacancies left by bankrupt clubs in the third tier of Italian football and winning the 2019-20 Serie C playoff, returning to Serie B after an absence of 21 years, gaining subsequently two consecutive promotions.

A.C. Reggiana 1919 (2020–present) 
On 28 July 2020, the club changed its name back to A.C. Reggiana 1919.

Colors and badges

The team's home jersey color is granata (maroon), hence the nickname "Granata" or "Regia".  However, the team's shorts are traditionally dark blue, and their badge has traditionally been an orange football surrounded by the text: "Associazione Calcio Reggiana " surrounded by a Granata border.

Stadium
Reggiana played all of its matches in Stadio Mirabello until 1994, when it moved to a modern arena, Stadio Città del Tricolore (a site previously known as Stadio Giglio). The stadium was subsequently bought by U.S. Sassuolo Calcio.

Fans
Like other Italian cities, the birth of the "ultras" phenomenon in the 1980s also affected A.C. Reggiana. With Reggiana battling for Serie B and Cantine Riunite Reggio Emilia competing in Lega Basket Serie A, the youth of the city formed and gathered in ultras every Sunday.

The leading group of Reggiana "Curva Sud" was "Ultras Ghetto", which was famous for its choreography.  Since the late 1990s, the leading groups are "Teste Quadre" and "Gruppo Vandelli", which situate themselves in the East Stand of the stadium. Reggiana fans have always had good numbers on away days with a peak of 10,000 fans in Milan in 1994.

Friendships and rivalries
Reggiana fans have good and friendly relationships with fans from:
 Genoa
 Cremonese
 Vicenza
 Carrarese
Greenock Morton 

The main rivals are:
 Parma, see Derby dell'Enza
 Modena, Secchia Derby
 Sassuolo
 SPAL
 Spezia
 Bologna
 Piacenza

Notable players

Former Reggiana players have included:

Italy
  Andrea Silenzi
 Paolo Ponzo 
   Felice Romano
 Angelo Di Livio
  Fabrizio Ravanelli
  Luca Bucci
  Stefano Torrisi
  Francesco Antonioli
  Angelo Adamo Gregucci
  Filippo Galli
  Alberico Evani
  Luigi Sartor
  Marco Ballotta
  Max Tonetto
  Cristiano Zanetti
  Michele Padovano
  Sandro Tovalieri
  Francesco Pedone
  Fabrizio Cacciatore
  Francesco Ruopolo
  Giuseppe Alessi
  Alessandro Cesarini
  Giuseppe Scienza
  Marco Bresciani
  Giuseppe Accardi
  Fernando De Napoli
  Luigi De Agostini
  Stefano De Agostini
  Stefano Nava
  Massimo Paganin
  Daniele De Vezze
  Marco Romizi
  Raffaele Nuzzo
  Leonardo Colucci
  Andrea Catellani
  Luca Ariatti
  Marco Ambrosio
  Igor Protti
  Alessandro Bastrini
  Massimiliano Carlini
  Trevor Trevisan
  Marco Guidone
  Cristian Altinier
  Vito Grieco
  Andrea Bovo
  Luca Ghiringhelli
  Simone Calvano
  Andrea Parola
  Raffaele Nolè
  Michele Pazienza
  Daniele Mignanelli
  Federico Angiulli
  Paolo Zanetti
  Armando Pantanelli
  Gian Piero Gasperini
  Walter Mazzarri
  Gianluca Piaccitali
Austria
  Michael Hatz
Belgium
  Georges Grün
Brazil
  Cláudio Taffarel
  André Viapiana
  Robert Anderson
Colombia
  Adolfo Valencia
Croatia
  Bruno Petković
Czech Republic
  Edvard Lasota
Georgia
  Georgi Nemsadze
Germany
  Dietmar Beiersdorfer
England
  Franz Carr
France
  Gaël Genevier
Montenegro
  Minel Šabotić
  Hasim Đoković
Nigeria
  Sunday Oliseh
  Obafemi Martins
  Mathew Olorunleke
  Jero Shakpoke
  Prince Ikpe Ekong
  Saidu Adeshina
Portugal
  Paulo Futre
  António Pacheco
  Rui Águas
Romania
  Dorin Mateut
  Ioan Sabau
  Vasile Mogoș
Russia
  Igor Simutenkov
Spain
  Marti Riverola
Sweden
  Johnny Ekström
Venezuela
   Massimo Margiotta

Youth sector
Reggiana have always had a good tradition in developing youth players, being a rare club with a training ground which has 16 football pitches, located in the nearbies of the club house. The youth teams play their games in Stadio Mirabello, via Agosti training ground or in small grounds located in the local province.

The academy has produced various players, notably:

Italy
 Gino Giaroli
 Ettore Agazzani
 Stefano Aigotti
 Egidio Anceschi
 Alessio Badari
 Silvio Bandini
 Aldo Bedogni
 Oreste Benatti
 Carlo Benelli
 Roberto Benincasa
 Andrea Costa
 Simone Gozzi
 Danilo Zini
 Luca Ariatti
 Elvis Abbruscato
 Christian Araboni
 Alessandro Bertoni
 Leonida Bietti
 Ottorino Bojardi
 Leopoldo Bolognesi
 Alberto Boni
 Fabio Bonini
 Enrico Bottazzi
 Denis Brunazzi
 Aldo Cagnoli
 Giovanni Campari
 Fabio Caselli
 Ilario Castagner
 Aldo Catalani
 Andrea Catellani
 Maurizio Cavazzoni
 Gianluca Cherubini
Gabon
 Catilina Aubameyang
Ghana
 Boadu Maxwell Acosty
Morocco
 Hachim Mastour
Nigeria
 Stephen Makinwa
 Saidu Adeshina

Players

Current squad

Out on loan

Backdoor and directors staff

Notable managers

The team's most famous coach was Carlo Ancelotti, who coached AC Milan from 2001 to 2009 and then managed Juventus, Chelsea, Paris Saint-Germain, Real Madrid, Bayern Munich, Napoli and currently Everton.

 1919-20:  Severino Taddei
 1920-22:  Karl Stürmer
 1922-23:   Felice Romano
 1923-24:  Karl Stürmer
 1924-25:  Severino Taddei
 1925-26:  Ottorino Bojardi
 1926:  Karl Stürmer
 1926-28:  Vilmos Zsigsmond
 1928-29:  Anton Ringer
 1929-30:  Severino Taddei
 1930-34:  Regolo Ferretti 
 1934-35:  Mora Maurer
 1935-37:  Italo Rossi
 1937-39:  Giuseppe Valenti
 1939-1942:  János Vanicsek
 1942:  Luigi Bernardi and William Ruozi
 1942-43:  Alfredo Mazzoni
 1943-44:  Regolo Ferretti 
 1945-46:   Felice Romano 
 1946-47:  Bruno Vale
 1947:  Alcide Ivan Violi 
 1947-48:  Angelo Mattea
 1948-49:  Piero Ferrari 
 1949:  Bruno Arcari
 1949-52:  Giuseppe Antonini
 1952:  Vittorio Malagoli 
 1952-53:  Guido Masetti
 1953-54:  Alcide Ivan Violi
 1954-62:  Luigi Del Grosso 
 1962:  Angelo Piccioli 
 1962-63:  Renato Martini 
 1963:  Vittorio Malagoli 
 1963-64:  Giancarlo Cadé
 1964-65:  Dino Ballacci 
 1965-70:  Romolo Bizzotto 
 1970-74:  Ezio Galbiati 
 1974:  Giampiero Grevi and Giovanni Galbiati 
 1974-75:  Tito Corsi 
 1975-76:  Carmelo Di Bella
 1976:  Bruno Giorgi
 1976-77:  Mario Caciagli 
 1977-79:  Guido Mammi 
 1979-80:  Franco Marini 
 1980-83:  Romano Fogli
 1983:  Giovan Battista Fabbri 
 1983-84:  Lauro Toneatto
 1984-86:  Franco Fontana 
 1986:  Giancarlo Cadé
 1986-88:  Nello Santin
 1988:  Marino Perani
 1988-94:  Giuseppe Marchioro 
 1994-95:  Enzo Ferrari
 1995:  Cesare Vitale 
 1995-96:  Giorgio Ciaschini and Carlo Ancelotti 
 1996:  Adelio Moro and  Mircea Lucescu
 1996-97:  Francesco Oddo 
 1997-98:  Franco Varrella
 1998-99:  Attilio Perotti
 1999:  Franco Varrella 
 1999:  Angelo Gregucci and Fabiano Speggiorin 
 1999-00:  Giorgio Rumignani 
 2000:  Luigi Maifredi
 2000-01:  Claudio Testoni 
 2001-02:  Salvatore Vullo
 2002:  Lorenzo Mossini
 2002-03:  Adriano Cadregari
 2003-04:  Antonio Sala
 2004:  Adriano Cadregari
 2004-05:  Bruno Giordano 
 2005-06:  Luciano Foschi 
 2006-09:  Alessandro Pane
 2009-10:  Loris Dominissini
 2010-12:  Amedeo Mangone 
 2012:  Lamberto Zauli and Salvatore Lanna
 2012-13:  Lamberto Zauli
 2013:  Luigi Apolloni
 2013:  Lamberto Zauli
 2013-14:  Pierfrancesco Battistini
 2014:  Marcello Montanari 
 2014-16:  Alberto Colombo 
 2016-17:  Leonardo Colucci
 2017:  Leonardo Menichini
 2017:  Massimiliano La Rosa and Andrea Tedeschi
 2017-2018:  Sergio Eberini
 2018-2019:  Mauro Antonioli
 2019–2021:  Massimiliano Alvini
 2021–present:  Aimo Diana

Honours
 Serie B
Winners (1): 1992–93
 Serie C1
Winners (6):  1939–40, 1957–58, 1963–64, 1970–71, 1980–81, 1988–89
 Serie C2
Winners (1):  2007–08, 
 Supercoppa di Serie C2
Winners (1): 2008

Divisional movements

References

External links

 

 
1919 establishments in Italy
Association football clubs established in 1919
Football clubs in Emilia-Romagna
Football clubs in Italy
Italian football First Division clubs
Serie C clubs
Serie A clubs
Serie B clubs
Serie D clubs
Phoenix clubs (association football)
2005 establishments in Italy
2018 establishments in Italy